Person of the Year (called Man of the Year or Woman of the Year until 1999) is an annual issue of the American news magazine and website Time featuring a person, a group, an idea, or an object that "for better or for worse ... has done the most to influence the events of the year". The editors of Time magazine select the featured subject, though the Time website also runs an annual reader's poll that has no effect on the selection.

Background
The tradition of selecting a "Man of the Year" began in 1927, with Time editors contemplating the news makers of the year. The idea was also an attempt to remedy the editorial embarrassment earlier that year of not having aviator Charles Lindbergh on its cover following his historic transatlantic flight. By the end of the year, it was decided that a cover story featuring Lindbergh as the Man of the Year would serve both purposes.

Selection

U.S. presidents and other nation's leaders
Since the list began, every serving president of the United States has been a Man or Person of the Year at least once with the exceptions of Calvin Coolidge (in office at time of the first issue), Herbert Hoover (the subsequent president), and Gerald Ford (only president never to have been elected to the office of president or vice president). Most were named Man or Person of the Year either the year they were elected or while they were in office; the only one to be given the title before being elected is Dwight D. Eisenhower, in 1944 as Supreme Commander of the Allied Invasion Force, eight years before his election. He subsequently received the title again in 1959, while in office. Franklin D. Roosevelt is the only person to have received the title three times, first as president-elect (1932) and later as the incumbent president (1934, 1941).

All countries heads of state or government to have been chosen as Man, Woman, or Person of the Year (arranged in chronological order by country name, from the most frequently selected) are:

 Notes
Winston Churchill was chosen a second time for the special "Man of the Half-Century" edition in 1949 while serving as Leader of the Opposition before his second premiership; Charles de Gaulle was chosen while being elected President of France before formally taking office; Lech Wałęsa and Nelson Mandela were chosen before being elected President of Poland and President of South Africa, respectively.

Women 
Before 1999, four women were granted the title as individuals: three as "Woman of the Year"—Wallis Simpson (1936), Queen Elizabeth II (1952), and Corazon Aquino (1986)—and one as half of "Man and Wife of the Year," Soong Mei-ling (jointly with Chiang Kai-shek) in 1937. "American Women" were recognized as a group in 1975. Other classes of people recognized comprise both men and women, such as "Hungarian Freedom Fighters" (1956), "U.S. Scientists" (1960), "The Inheritors" (1966), "The Middle Americans" (1969), "The American Soldier" (1950 and 2003), "You" (2006), "The Protester" (2011), and "Ebola Fighters" (2014). However, the title on the magazine remained "Man of The Year" for both the 1956 "Hungarian Freedom Fighter" and the 1966 "Twenty-five and Under" editions which both featured a woman standing behind a man, and "Men of the Year" on the 1960 "U.S. Scientists" edition which exclusively featured men on its cover. It was not until the 1969 edition on "The Middle Americans" that the title embraced "Man and Woman of the Year".

In 1999, the title was changed to "Person of the Year". Women who have been selected for recognition after the renaming include "The Whistleblowers" (Cynthia Cooper, Coleen Rowley, and Sherron Watkins) in 2002; Melinda Gates (jointly with Bill Gates and Bono) in 2005; Angela Merkel (2015); "The Silence Breakers" (2017); Greta Thunberg (2019); and Kamala Harris (jointly with Joe Biden) in 2020. In order to celebrate International Women's Day in 2020, Time editors released 89 new magazine covers, each showing women, in addition to the 11 already chosen, as counterparts to the Man of the Year choices from the past century.

Groups and non-humans 
Despite the name, the title is not just granted to individuals. Pairs of people such as married couples and political opponents, classes of people, and inanimate objects have all been selected for the special year-end issue.

Multiple named people
 Chiang Kai-shek and Soong Mei-ling, president and first lady of China (1937)
 William Anders, Frank Borman and Jim Lovell, crew of Apollo 8 (1968)
 Richard Nixon and Henry Kissinger, political allies (1972)
 Ronald Reagan and Yuri Andropov, Cold War rivals (1983)
 Nelson Mandela and F. W. de Klerk; Yasser Arafat and Yitzhak Rabin, political leaders leading peace negotiations (1993)
 Bill Clinton and Ken Starr, key figures in the Clinton impeachment (1998)
 Cynthia Cooper, Coleen Rowley and Sherron Watkins, whistleblowers (2002)
 Bill Gates, Melinda Gates and Bono, philanthropists (2005)
 Joe Biden and Kamala Harris, American president-elect and vice president-elect (2020)

Classes of unnamed people
 The American fighting-man / The American soldier (1950, 2003)
 The Hungarian freedom fighter (1956)
 U.S. scientists (1960)
 The Inheritor (1966)
 Middle Americans (1969)
 American women (1975)
 You (2006)
 The Protester (2011)
 Ebola fighters (2014)
 The Silence Breakers (2017)
 The Guardians (2018)

Inanimate objects
 The Computer (Machine of the Year, 1982)
 The Endangered Earth (Planet of the Year, 1988)

Abstract concepts
 The Spirit of Ukraine (2022)

Special editions 
In 1949, Winston Churchill was named Man of the Half-Century, and the last issue of 1989 named Mikhail Gorbachev as "Man of the Decade." The December 31, 1999 issue of Time named Albert Einstein the "Person of the Century." Both Franklin D. Roosevelt and Mahatma Gandhi were chosen as runners-up.

Controversial choices 
Despite the magazine's frequent statements to the contrary, the designation is often regarded as an honor and spoken of as an award or prize, simply based on many previous selections of admirable people. However, Time magazine points out that controversial figures such as Adolf Hitler (1938); Joseph Stalin (1939, 1942); Nikita Khrushchev (1957); and Ayatollah Khomeini (1979) have also been granted the title for their impact on events. Nevertheless, as a result of the public backlash it received from the American audience for naming Khomeini Man of the Year in 1979, the magazine's editors have since shied away from using figures who are controversial in the United States for commercial reasons, fearing reductions in sales or advertising revenue.

Times Person of the Year for 2001, immediately following the September 11 attacks, was Rudy Giuliani, who served as mayor of New York City during that time. The stated rules of selection—the individual or group of individuals who have had the bigger influence on the year's events—made Osama bin Laden the more likely choice that year; however, Giuliani was selected for symbolizing the American response to the attacks, in the same way that Albert Einstein was selected Person of the Century for representing a century of scientific exploration and wonder instead of Adolf Hitler, who was arguably a stronger candidate. The selections were ultimately based on, as the magazine describes it, "who they believed had a stronger influence on history and who represented either the year or the century the most."

Withdrawn and alleged selections 

In 1941, the fictional elephant Dumbo from the Walt Disney's animated film of the same name was selected to be "Mammal of the Year", and a cover was created showing the title character in a formal portrait style. However, the attack on Pearl Harbor on December 7 pre-empted the cover. The U.S. president Franklin Delano Roosevelt was named Man of the Year for a record third time, although Dumbo's Mammal of the Year profile still appeared on the inside pages of the magazine.

Filmmaker Michael Moore claims that director Mel Gibson cost him the opportunity to be Person of the Year alongside Gibson in 2004. Moore's controversial political documentary Fahrenheit 9/11 became the highest-grossing documentary of all time the same year Gibson's The Passion of the Christ became a box-office success and also caused significant controversy. Moore said in an interview "I got a call right after the '04 election from an editor from Time Magazine. He said,' Time Magazine has picked you and Mel Gibson to be Times Person of the Year to put on the cover, Right and Left, Mel and Mike. The only thing you have to do is pose for a picture with each other. And do an interview together.' I said 'OK.' They call Mel up, he agrees. They set the date and time in LA. I'm to fly there. He's flying from Australia. Something happens when he gets home ... Next thing, Mel calls up and says, 'I'm not doing it. I've thought it over and it is not the right thing to do.' So they put Bush on the cover."

On November 24, 2017, U.S. president Donald Trump, who had this title the previous year, posted on the social media network Twitter that Time editors had told him he would "probably" be named Person of the Year for a second time, conditional on an interview and photo shoot, which he had refused. Time denied that they had made any such promises or conditions to Trump, who was named a runner-up.

Persons of the Year

Other categories 
In addition to the main Person of the Year list, Time has acknowledged other impactful people or groups in other categories.

Entertainer of the Year

Athlete of the Year

Businessperson of the Year

Kid of the Year

Heroes of the Year

Online poll 
Time magazine also holds an online poll for the readers to vote for who they believe to be the Person of the Year. While many mistakenly believe the winner of the poll to be the Person of the Year, the title, as mentioned above, is decided by the editors of Time. Time continues to annually run an online poll for the "People's Choice", but stresses the decision on whom the magazine recognizes is not made by the poll, but by the magazine's editors.

See also 
 Canadian Newsmaker of the Year (Time), printed in the Canadian issue of Time until 2008
 Breakthrough of the Year
 Forbes list of The World's Most Powerful People

References

External links 

Annual magazine issues
Celebrity
Time (magazine)